"Say It" is a single by new wave group ABC, with additional remixing by the team behind house group Black Box. It was released in 1991 as a 7" single, 12" single and CD single.

Critical reception
Upon its release as a single, Stuart Maconie of NME described "Say It" as an "inconsequential House ditty" and added, "I like the guitar, I like the Philly strings. I don't like anything else. But 'I was baked Alaska' must be the bravest lyrical gambit of the decade. A pity this germ of lunacy couldn't have infect more of the song."

Track listing

7" single 
 "Say It" (The Black Box Mix)
 "Say It" (The Abracadabra Mix)

12" single
 "Say It" (The Black Box Mix)
 "Say It" (The Black Box Mix Instrumental)
 "Say It" (The Black Box Piano Forte Mix)
 "Say It" (The Abracadabra Mix)

CD single
 "Say It" (The Black Box Mix Edit)
 "Say It" (The Abracadabra Mix)
 "Satori"
 "Say It" (The Black Box Mix)

Charts

References

ABC (band) songs
1991 singles
Songs written by Mark White (musician)
Songs written by Martin Fry
1991 songs
EMI Records singles